Porkerec is the Hungarian name for two villages in Romania:

 Purcărete village,  Negrileşti Commune, Bistriţa-Năsăud County
 Purcăreţ village, Letca Commune, Sălaj County (Pórkerec)